Pinner Football Club was a football club based in Pinner, England.

History
Founded in 1892, Pinner spent their formative years in the Middlesex Senior League and the London League, joining the Spartan League in 1927. In 1938, Pinner won the Spartan League Division Two. Following World War II, Pinner entered the FA Cup for the first time in 1945, losing 2–1 against Wealdstone in the preliminary round. In 1952, Pinner left the Spartan League, joining the Southern Amateur League until they folded in 1961.

Ground
The club initially played at Cuckoo Hill Road in Pinner, before moving to The Croft in 1957.

Records
Best FA Cup performance: Preliminary round, 1945–46, 1947–48

References

Pinner
Sport in the London Borough of Harrow
1892 establishments in England
Association football clubs established in 1892
1961 disestablishments in England
Association football clubs disestablished in 1961
Spartan League
London League (football)
Southern Amateur Football League
Defunct football clubs in London